Majorganj Assembly constituency was an assembly constituency in Sitamarhi district in the Indian state of Bihar. It was reserved for scheduled castes.

Overview
It was part of Sheohar Lok Sabha constituency.

As a consequence of the orders of the Delimitation Commission of India, Majorganj Assembly constituency ceased to exist in 2010.

Election results

1977-2005
In the October 2005 and February 2005 state assembly elections, Dinkar Ram of BJP won the 69 Majorganj (SC) assembly seat, defeating his nearest rival Lalita Devi representing Congress in October 2005 and representing RJD in February 2005. Contests in most years were multi cornered but only winners and runners are being mentioned. Gauri Shankar Nagdansh of BJP defeated Dinkar Ram representing RJD in 2000. Surender Ram of JD defeated Sanup Raut of BJP in 1995. Gauri Shankar Nagdansh representing JD defeated Sanup Raut of BJP in 1990. Ram Briksh Ram of Congress defeated Dinkar Ram representing JP in 1985 and representing Congress (U) in 1980. Surendra Ram of JP defeated Dip Narain Paswan of Congress in 1977.

See also
 Majorganj (community development block)

References

Former assembly constituencies of Bihar
Politics of Sitamarhi district